This Is How I Made It is an American reality-documentary television series on MTV. The series premiered on October 13, 2012. The series sheds light on the mountains that various athletes, actors, artists and other celebrities hurdled over in order to become the person they are today.

Episodes

References

External links
 
 

2010s American documentary television series
2012 American television series debuts
2012 American television series endings
English-language television shows
MTV original programming